Kezia Roslin Cikita Warouw (born 17 April 1991) is an Indonesian National Narcotics Board of the Republic of Indonesia Ambassador, TV presenter, model and beauty pageant titleholder who won Puteri Indonesia 2016. She represented Indonesia at the Miss Universe 2016 pageant, and placed "Top 13", the second highest placement that an  Indonesian  representative has achieved. She also won "Miss Phoenix Smile" and placed as a Top 10 in Best in National Costume competition at Miss Universe 2016. She is the fifth Indonesian and the first Minahasan to be called as Miss Universe Finalists.

Personal life, career and education

Kezia was born and grew up in North Sulawesi, with a Minahasan tribe descent. She started in a contest as Noni North Sulawesi and Puteri Indonesia North Sulawesi 2016. She graduated from the Esa Unggul University with a degree in engineering informatics. Kezia worked as a bank officer. She also made her own android application in order to promote eco-tourism in Indonesia. On 16 May 2016, Kezia was chosen as The Ambassador of National Narcotics Board of the Republic of Indonesia by head of National Narcotics Board of the Republic of Indonesia, Budi Waseso.

On 2 September 2018, Kezia Warouw married to an Indonesian National Police Officer Christian Rante Padang, Kezia and Christian had previously been engaged on September 1, 2017. On 24 November 2020, she gave birth to her only daughter, Kylie Dyke Rantepadang in Manado, North Sulawesi - Indonesia.

Pageantry

Puteri Indonesia 2016
On 19 February 2016, Kezia represented the North Sulawesi province at Puteri Indonesia 2016. Kezia was crowned Puteri Indonesia 2016 at the finals held at the Jakarta Convention Center, Jakarta, by the outgoing predecessor of Puteri Indonesia 2015 and Top 15 Miss Universe 2015 Anindya Kusuma Putri of Central Java.

Kezia was the second woman from North Sulawesi to be selected as the winner of the Puteri Indonesia, after Angelina Sondakh in 2001. As Puteri Indonesia 2016 she began volunteering for Smile Train Indonesia.

Kezia crowned together with another Puteri Indonesia 2016 Queens; Puteri Indonesia Lingkungan; Felicia Hwang Yi Xin of Lampung, Puteri Indonesia Pariwisata; Intan Aletrinö of West Sumatra and Puteri Indonesia Perdamaian; Ariska Putri Pertiwi of North Sumatra.

Miss Universe 2016
Kezia represented Indonesia at Miss Universe 2016 at the Mall of Asia Arena, in Pasay, Metro Manila, Philippines on January 30, 2017. where she continued Indonesia's stake in the Miss Universe pageant by placing in the semifinals for a fourth consecutive time finishing as a "Top 13 finalist" and become one of the Top 10 in Best National Costume with Golden Garuda Pancasila National Costume designed by Jember Fashion Carnaval.

She is also wearing evening gown designed by Ivan Gunawan. During pre-pageant activities Kezia was a catwalk model for Mindanao Tapestry: The Neo-Ethnic Fashion of Renee Salud and the Mindanao Weavers (T'nalak), held in SM City Davao. During Mindanao Tapestry: The Neo-Ethnic Fashion week, Kezia won "Miss Phoenix Smile" by local sponsor Phoenix Petroleum.

Filmography
Kezia has presenting on several variety talk show.

Talk show

See also
Miss Universe 2016
Puteri Indonesia 2016
Felicia Hwang Yi Xin
Intan Aletrinö

References

External links
 
 Official Puteri Indonesia Official Website
 Official Miss Universe Official Website
 Kezia Warouw Official Instagram

Living people
1991 births
Indo people
Minahasa people
Puteri Indonesia winners
Miss Universe 2016 contestants
Indonesian beauty pageant winners
Indonesian female models
Indonesian people of Chinese descent
Indonesian people of Dutch descent
Actresses from Jakarta
Actresses from North Sulawesi